Urge to Kill is a 1960 British B-movie serial killer film directed by Vernon Sewell and starring Patrick Barr, Ruth Dunning and Terence Knapp.  The film is based on the 1942 novel Hughie Roddis and 1944 play Hand in Glove, both by Gerald Savory.  It is regarded as a minor cult film thanks to its unrelenting shabby grimness and some dated dialogue – an intellectually disabled suspect is repeatedly referred to as "a mental case", whilst another character, trying to work out why one hapless victim was selected for her grisly fate, speculates "perhaps she was a Jezebel."

Plot
While making her way home from the cinema one night in a particularly grey and drab town, a young woman is murdered in an unusually brutal and sadistic manner.  Local suspicion immediately falls on Hughie (Knapp), a strangely behaved and not very bright local youth who has a habit of wandering aimlessly around the town at all hours randomly collecting stray bits and pieces, with a particular fondness for broken glass – which unfortunately for Hughie happens to have been one of the weapons used in the fatal attack.

Hughie lives in the lodging house run by his aunt (Dunning), along with a selection of boarders including a kindly elderly gent with a penchant for Bible-bashing (Wilfrid Brambell) and a smooth-talking ladies man (Howard Pays).  Hughie is questioned by the police, but Superintendent Allen (Barr) releases him as there is no firm evidence against him.  A few days later another girl is killed in the town, and the locals make up their minds that Hughie is responsible and launch a witch-hunt against him.  Believing the police are failing to do their job properly, they start issuing death threats against him after gathering in the pub to discuss the case, and the front window of the lodging house is put through by a large rock.  Again, Allen's instincts tell him that Hughie is basically a harmless if odd soul, and is not responsible for the killings.  He starts to look more closely at other individuals connected to Hughie, in the belief that somebody is going out of their way to set him up.  While the townsfolk continue their vendetta, Allen quietly observes and finds his attention focussed on a likely suspect.  He shadows the individual as he walks the streets of the town one night and catches the guilty party almost in the act, narrowly saving another young woman from a murderous attack.

Cast
 Patrick Barr as Superintendent Allen
 Ruth Dunning as Auntie B.
 Terence Knapp as Hughie
 Howard Pays as Charles Ramskill
 Anna Turner as Lily Willis
 Christopher Trace as Sgt. Grey
 Wilfrid Brambell as Mr. Forsythe
 Margaret St. Barbe West as Mrs. Willis
 Yvonne Buckingham as Gwen
 Rita Webb as Charwoman

External links 
 
 Urge to Kill at BFI Film & TV Database

1960 films
1960s serial killer films
1960s thriller films
British thriller films
Films directed by Vernon Sewell
British serial killer films
British black-and-white films
Edgar Wallace Mysteries
Films based on multiple works
British films based on plays
Films based on British novels
1960s English-language films
1960s British films